Enonic AS is a Norwegian IT company, primarily known for the open-source web platform and content management system Enonic XP. The company was established in 2000 and has headquarters in Norway.

Enonic's platform focuses on fast development of progressive websites and applications, as well as scalable solutions to be run in any cloud. The target group is both private and public companies from medium to large-sized organizations, and customers include the national postal service Norway Post, the insurance company Gjensidige, the national lottery Norsk Tipping, the Norwegian Labour and Welfare Administration, and all the top football clubs in Eliteserien.

The company previously had a subsidiary in London.

Products 
Enonic’s software is used for operating and developing websites and other digital services:

 Enonic XP: Web platform and CMS in one based on JavaScript and Java. Scoring an average of 4.8 of 5 at Gartner Peer Insights, Enonic XP is used for building progressive web apps, Next.js websites and web-based APIs.
 Progressive web apps: Enonic XP supports development and operations of so-called “progressive web apps” (PWA), a form of websites that can work as native apps on smartphones and tablets.
 Purple.js: Open-source JavaScript framework making it possible to code both client and server side of applications in JavaScript, run on a Java Virtual Machine (JVM) server.
 Enonic Cloud: Cloud service for hosting Enonic XP and receiving support. Enonic XP is also available on Google Cloud Platform and other cloud services.
 Enonic Market: Marketplace for applications, libraries and starters for developers, to be used in Enonic XP—including Google Analytics integration, GraphQL library and a starter kit for building PWAs.

History 
Enonic AS were founded in 2000 by Morten Øien Eriksen and Thomas Sigdestad. The software company specialized in building services with Java, including a content management system called “Enonic CMS.” After observing different teams for application development, databases and websites working in silos toward a common goal, Enonic chose to combine the different elements to one single software. The resulting application platform Enonic XP surfaced in 2015, and included as CMS as an optional component. The company has also been featured several times on Deloitte's Fast 50 and Fast 500 awards, which ranks the fastest growing technology companies in Norway and globally, respectively. In 2020, 2021, and 2022, the Enonic platform was ranked as "Leader" in the SoftwareReviews Digital Experience Platform category.

References 

Software companies of Norway